Marikina Shoemasters are a professional basketball team in the Maharlika Pilipinas Basketball League (MPBL). The team also participated in the Chooks-to-Go Pilipinas 3x3.

History

Current roster

Head coaches

All-time roster

 Gerald Anderson (2018–2019)
 Joshua Gonzales (2018–present)
 JR Ng–Sang (2018–present)
 Ronald Roy (2018–present)
 Yves Sason (2018–present)
 Warren Ybañez (2018–2020)

Season-by-season records
Records from the 2022-23 MPBL season:

References

 
2018 establishments in the Philippines
Basketball teams established in 2018
Maharlika Pilipinas Basketball League teams
Sports teams in Metro Manila
Chooks-to-Go Pilipinas 3x3 teams